The Savings Bank of the Province of Bolzano / South Tyrol is an Italian savings bank based in Bolzano, the capital of South Tyrol autonomous region.

Due to Italian banking reform, the bank was separate into a S.p.A. and a banking foundation (Stiftung Südtiroler Sparkasse – Fondazione Cassa di Risparmio di Bolzano) in 1992.

Banca Popolare di Lodi (BPL) was a minority shareholders of the bank, which Reti Bancarie acted as a sub-holding company for 19.99%. In 2006 Reti Bancarie was absorbed into BPL, as well as the bank sold 10% back to the banking foundation of the savings bank. On 20 December 2007 the remaining 9.99% was sold by Banco Popolare to the foundation.

As at 31 December 2014 the banking foundation owned 66.02% stake of the bank; among other investors, Banca Popolare di Puglia e Basilicata owned 0.07% stake. In 2020 Sparkasse continues the decrease in risks expressed by the net Npl ratio indicator which reaches the level of 1.8% compared to 2.3% in 2019.

References

See also

 Angonese v Cassa di Risparmio di Bolzano SpA
 Raiffeisen Landesbank Südtirol – Cassa Centrale Raiffeisen dell'Alto Adige another South Tyrol bank
 Südtiroler Volksbank – Banca Popolare dell'Alto Adige another South Tyrol bank

Banks established in 1854
Italian companies established in 1854
1854 establishments in the Austrian Empire
Banks of Italy
Companies based in South Tyrol
Bolzano